The First Round-Up is a 1934 Our Gang short comedy film directed by Gus Meins. It was the 128th (40th talking episode) Our Gang short that was released.

Plot
Wally Albright and the gang have planned for an elaborate camping trip for a week at Cherry Creek, but Wally's father is convinced his boy and the others will be back by nightfall. Meanwhile, Wally and Stymie try to shoo off Spanky and Scotty rather than to have to drag them along. Their reasoning is that the kids would never survive the trip, but upon arrival, Spanky and Scotty are already there after having hitchhiked their way to the site. This results in the theme of the trip with the younger boys reminding the older boys of their reluctance to have them around them. The little kids are also the only ones who planned far enough ahead to bring food, sharing it with the big kids in one big mob. As things get darker, the big kids get scared as the younger ones get excited, making shadows from their lamp which adds to the thunder and lightning passing over, inadvertently scaring off the older kids. Left alone, Scotty and Spanky are by themselves as their lamp is carried by a turtle under it into the creek, where it goes out. Spooked, they jump into their sleeping bags and stick their legs out to race after the big kids running home.

Cast

The Gang
 Wally Albright as Wally
 Matthew Beard as Stymie
 Scotty Beckett as Scotty
 Tommy Bond as Tommy
 George McFarland as Spanky
 Willie Mae Taylor (a girl) as Buckwheat (as a female character)
 Billy Wolfstone as Marvin
 Cullen Johnson as Our Gang member
 Philbrook Lyons as Our Gang member
 Pete the Pup as himself

Additional cast
 Jacqueline Taylor as Jane
 Billie Thomas as boy emptying the gang's canteens. (Billie Thomas would later become famous for playing "Buckwheat" when the character's gender was morphed from female to male.)
 Billy Bletcher as Wally's father
 Zoila Conan as Wally's mother

See also
 Our Gang filmography

References

External links

1934 films
1934 comedy films
American black-and-white films
Films directed by Gus Meins
Metro-Goldwyn-Mayer short films
1934 short films
Our Gang films
1930s American films